Triphysa is a genus of butterflies in the family Nymphalidae. The genus contains three species. The genus is sometimes included in Coenonympha.

Species
Triphysa dohrnii Zeller, 1850
Triphysa nervosa Motschulsky, 1866
Triphysa phryne (Pallas, 1771)

References
"Triphysa Zeller, 1850" at Markku Savela's Lepidoptera and Some Other Life Forms

Satyrini
Butterfly genera